Menteşe   (former Genek) is a town in Kavaklıdere district of Muğla Province, Turkey.

Geography 
The population of the town is 2,356 as of 2011.

History

In antiquity, the area around Menteşe was a part of Karia. In 1270, it became a part of Seljuks of Turkey which was in the state of disintegration. It was named after a Turkmen leader named  Menteşe. In 1424 the area was incorporated into Ottoman realm. The exact foundation date of the settlement  is not known. But according to tradition the settlement was founded by a tribe leader named Çoban Yürük Hacı Mehmet Şeyh. Settlement was declared a seat of township in 1972.

Economy 

The economy of the town depends on agriculture as well as small industry. Hickory nut, chesnut and cherry are among the main crops. Carpet weaving,  copper works and whitesmithing are the small industries of the town.

References

Populated places in Muğla Province
Towns in Turkey
Kavaklıdere District